Corey James Kispert (born March 3, 1999) is an American professional basketball player for the Washington Wizards of the National Basketball Association (NBA). He played college basketball for the Gonzaga Bulldogs, where he was a consensus first-team All-American as a senior.

High school career
Kispert grew up in Edmonds, Washington and attended King's High School. As a junior, he averaged 23.9 points, 6.8 rebounds, 3.4 assists and 2.3 steals per game, led the team to their second straight state title, and was named the MVP of the State Championship Tournament. Rated a four-star recruit, Kispert committed to play college basketball at Gonzaga over Notre Dame  after his junior season. Kispert was averaging 25 points per game during his senior year before breaking his foot in February.

Kispert said in 2021 that Virginia head coach Tony Bennett told Kispert he "needed to see Corey play more against top competition before deciding if he could play at Virginia" and that motivated him to "stick it to" Virginia in an early season game; Virginia had recruited Kispert but did not offer him a scholarship before he committed to Gonzaga.

College career
As a true freshman Kispert played in all 35 of Gonzaga's games with seven starts, averaging 6.7 points and 3.2 rebounds per game. He became a starter for the Bulldogs going into his sophomore season, averaging 8.0 points and 4.1 rebounds per game.

Kispert entered his junior season on the Julius Erving Award watchlist and as Gonzaga's only returning starter from the previous year. After scoring less than five points in his previous three games, Kispert scored 28 points and made seven of eight three point attempts on November 28, 2019 against Southern Mississippi in the opening round of the 2019 Battle 4 Atlantis. He scored 26 points with five three pointers made against North Carolina in a 94–81 victory. At the conclusion of the regular season, Kispert was named to the First Team All-West Coast Conference. Kispert averaged 13.9 points per game as a junior. Following the season, he declared for the 2020 NBA draft but did not hire an agent. Kispert ultimately decided to return for his senior season on August 3.

Coming into his senior season, Kispert was named to the Preseason All-West Coast Conference team. He scored his 1,000th career point in the season opener against Kansas as part of a 23-point performance in the 102–90 victory. On December 26, 2020, Kispert scored a career-high 32 points, tying the school record with nine three-pointers, in a 98–75 win against Virginia. He led Gonzaga to a 31–1 record, its only loss coming against Baylor in the national championship game. Kispert was named WCC Player of the Year and won the Julius Erving Award as the top small forward in the nation. As a senior, he averaged 18.6 points and five rebounds per game.

Professional career

Washington Wizards (2021–present) 
On July 29, 2021, Kispert was drafted with the 15th overall pick in the 2021 NBA draft by the Washington Wizards. On August 4, he signed his rookie scale contract with the Wizards. Kispert made his NBA debut on October 22, scoring two points in a 135–134 overtime win over the Indiana Pacers. On March 27, 2022, he scored a career-high 25 points, alongside three assists, in a 123–115 win over the Golden State Warriors. Kispert played in 77 games and started 36 during his rookie campaign, averaging 8.2 points per game.

Career statistics

NBA

|-
| style="text-align:left;"| 2021–22
| style="text-align:left;"| Washington
| 77 || 36 || 23.4 || .455 || .350 || .871 || 2.7 || 1.1 || .5 || .3 || 8.2
|- class="sortbottom"
| style="text-align:center;" colspan="2"| Career
| 77 || 36 || 23.4 || .455 || .350 || .871 || 2.7 || 1.1 || .5 || .3 || 8.2

College

|-
| style="text-align:left;"| 2017–18
| style="text-align:left;"| Gonzaga
| 35 || 7 || 19.4 || .460 || .351 || .667 || 3.2 || .7 || .3 || .2 || 6.7
|-
| style="text-align:left;"| 2018–19
| style="text-align:left;"| Gonzaga
| 37 || 36 || 26.1 || .437 || .374 || .875 || 4.1 || 1.0 || .6 || .5 || 8.0
|-
| style="text-align:left;"| 2019–20
| style="text-align:left;"| Gonzaga
| 33 || 33 || 33.0 || .474 || .438 || .810 || 4.0 || 2.1 || .9 || .4 || 13.9
|-
| style="text-align:left;"| 2020–21
| style="text-align:left;"| Gonzaga
| 32 || 32 || 31.8 || .529 || .440 || .878 || 5.0 || 1.8 || .9 || .4 || 18.6
|- class="sortbottom"
| style="text-align:center;" colspan="2"| Career
| 137 || 108 || 27.4 || .483 || .408 || .824 || 4.0 || 1.4 || .7 || .4 || 11.6

References

External links

Gonzaga Bulldogs bio

1999 births
Living people
All-American college men's basketball players
American men's basketball players
Basketball players from Washington (state)
Gonzaga Bulldogs men's basketball players
People from Edmonds, Washington
Small forwards
Sportspeople from the Seattle metropolitan area
Washington Wizards draft picks
Washington Wizards players